Obliquity: Why our goals are best achieved indirectly is a book by economist John Kay. It was inspired by an observation of the successful pharmaceutical researcher, Sir James Black:

The theme of the book is that businesses and other enterprises are best run by enthusiasts who pursue excellence in their speciality. Financial success then follows from this. But, if financial goals are instead made the primary objective, the business will then lose its vigour and may fail.

References

External links
 Author's official website

2010 non-fiction books
Business books